Tzahi Ilos (born August 13, 1978 in Hadera, Israel) is a retired footballer. Ilos is the captain of the Israel national beach soccer team and he also was the coach of the national side.

Sports career
Ilos started his career in Maccabi Haifa as a youth player but never played in the senior team. He moved to Hapoel Haifa in the Old Liga Leumit and went to play in small teams in the lower levels of the Israeli football league system, among them Hakoah Maccabi Ramat Gan, Hapoel Hadera, Ironi Kiryat Shmona.

After 3 years in the lower levels he got signed by Maccabi Netanya and returned to the top division of Israel. After a year and a half in Maccabi Netanya he returned to Hapoel Haifa and after one season in Hapoel Haifa he returned to play in the lower levels in Israel.

In the summer of 2007 Ilos became the biggest name in the Israel Beach Soccer League and also got to be the captain of the Israel national beach soccer team.  Ilos had an unsuccessful trial with the top Czech football club Sparta Prague.

Honors

Team
 Israel Beach Soccer League: 2007 – With Netanya Diamonds

With the Israel national beach soccer team:

 Diamonds Tournament: 2007 – 1st place
 Challenge Cup: 2008 – 1st place

Individual
 Israeli Indoor League - 2011-12 Top goalscorer (with 39 goals)

See also
Sports in Israel

References

External links
 

1978 births
Israeli Jews
Living people
Israeli footballers
Hapoel Haifa F.C. players
Hakoah Maccabi Ramat Gan F.C. players
Hapoel Hadera F.C. players
Hapoel Ironi Kiryat Shmona F.C. players
Maccabi Netanya F.C. players
Hapoel Tzafririm Holon F.C. players
Maccabi Kafr Kanna F.C. players
Maccabi HaShikma Ramat Hen F.C. players
Maccabi Ironi Kfar Yona F.C. players
Maccabi Kafr Qara F.C. players
Liga Leumit players
Israeli Premier League players
Israeli beach soccer players
Footballers from Hadera
Association football forwards